Central Union High School may refer to:
Central Union High School (El Centro, California)
Central Union High School (Fresno, California)